The 2004 Dunedin mayoral election elected Peter Chin as Mayor of Dunedin. The election was conducted under the Single transferable vote voting system. Chin replaced Sukhi Turner, who retired from the mayoralty.

Results
The following table shows the detailed results for the 9 October 2004 election:

References 

2004
2004 elections in New Zealand
Politics of Dunedin
2000s in Dunedin